Yesterday Once More is a 2016 Chinese youth romance film directed by Yoyo Yao and starring Bai Jingting, Guo Shutong, Li Hongyi, Wang Herun, Ding Guansen, and Zhao Wenlong. It was released in China by Beijing Enlight Pictures on April 22, 2016.

Plot
Lin Tianjiao (Guo Shutong) is the top girl in her school. During one of her tests, she resorts to copying from notes, and is spotted by Gao Xiang (Bai Jingting), who is considered a wayward student. When the note is discovered by the teacher, Gao Xiang chooses to claim responsibility for trying to cheat. Lin Tianjiao feels apologetic towards Gao Xiang, and begins their friendship.

Meanwhile, Lin Tianjiao's good friend, Lu Tiantian (Wang Herun) is courting Ou Xiaoyang (Ding Guansen). However, due to his poor academic standing, Lin Tianjiao ignores him completely. Classmate Huang Tao (Li Hongyi) is secretly in love with Lin Tianjiao, but is too shy to express it. As a result, he and his best buddy, Li Tao (Zhao Wenlong) are at loggerheads with Gao Xiang.

The relationship between Lin Tianjiao and Gao Xiang develops, as she begins to understand Gao Xiang better. Knowing that she likes astronomy, Gao Xiang buys tickets for an Astronomy Exhibition to take Lin Tianjiao on a date. Lin Tianjiao's mother insists that Lin Tianjiao focus on her school work, and does not allow her any time off. As a result, Gao Xiang never gets to go on the date with Lin Tianjiao.

Meanwhile, as an act of love for Lin Tianjiao, Gao Xiang sneaks into the Astronomy Exhibition at night to take photographs of the place. He is arrested and forced to quit school. Before leaving, him and his friends from the local auto-shop sneak into the school to paint astronomical images on the walls and ceiling of the classroom that Gao Xiang and Lin Tianjiao studied in.

At the annual school awards, the best student award is given to Lin Tianjiao. Huang Tao tells her that Gao Xiang is leaving town. Lin Tianjiao uses this opportunity to give a speech exposing her selfishness as she sought the award. From ignoring the feelings of Lu Tiantian (and her relationship with Ou Xiaoyang) and her brother, Lin Ziao; as well as her good friend, Gao Xiang. She then declines the award, and leaves the auditorium to rush to the train station to bid farewell to Gao Xiang.

Unfortunately, she misses Gao Xiang. She (plus her brother, Lu Tiantian and Ou Xiaoyang) run into Gao Xiang's friends from the auto-shop, and hitch a ride to the local radio station, where Lin Tianjiao uses the programming to bid farewell to Gao Xiang (by singing the Beatles' song "Hey Jude").

After a few years, Lin Tianjiao is a famous astronomer. She gave up on her mother's plan for her to study finance in Tsinghua University, and decided to follow her own dreams of pursuing astronomy. She plans a trip to Africa, hoping to meet Gao Xiang there. Meanwhile, the rest of the group meet at Huang Tao's wedding, with Li Tao as his best man. Lu Tiantian and Ou Xiaoyang are still courting, and Ou Xiaoyang intends to propose to her.

Cast
Bai Jingting
Guo Shutong
Li Hongyi
Wang Herun
Ding Guansen
Zhao Wenlong
Hu Xianxu

Soundtrack

Confusion of Youth by Bai Jingting, Li Hongyi, Zhao Wenlong, Ding Guansen
Big-Headed Love by Ding Guansen
Towards the Light by Xu Weizhou
Never Say Goodbye by Xu Fei
Never Say Goodbye by Hao Mei Mei Yue Dui

References

Chinese romance films
Chinese coming-of-age films
2010s romance films
Beijing Enlight Pictures films
Chinese teen films